Adnan Menderes Airport railway station also referred to as just Airport is a railway station in southern Gaziemir. The station is served by regional trains heading to southwestern Turkey, operated by the Turkish State Railways. The station allows a connection for people between planes at Adnan Menderes Airport to direct train service into İzmir. All regional trains stops at the station. The station was built in 1987 along with the completion of the airport. The İZBAN commuter rail service began serving the station on August 30, 2010. İZBAN operates between Alsancak Terminal in İzmir and Cumaovası.

Airport railway stations in Turkey
Adnan Menderes
Railway stations in İzmir Province
Railway stations opened in 1987
1987 establishments in Turkey
Gaziemir District